Maurice Buret (21 May 1909 – 23 August 2003) was a French military officer, equestrian, and Olympic champion. He won a gold medal in team dressage at the 1948 Summer Olympics in London.

Military awards
Legion of Honour (Chevalier)
Croix de Guerre with a gilt silver star

References

1909 births
2003 deaths
People from Sèvres
French dressage riders
Olympic equestrians of France
French male equestrians
Olympic gold medalists for France
Equestrians at the 1948 Summer Olympics
Olympic medalists in equestrian
Recipients of the Croix de Guerre 1939–1945 (France)
Medalists at the 1948 Summer Olympics
Sportspeople from Hauts-de-Seine
20th-century French people